Olimpia Ludovisi (1656 – 27 November 1700) was the ruling Princess of Piombino in 1700.

Life
She was the eldest daughter of Niccolò Ludovisi and his third wife Costanza Pamphili, sister of Vatican cardinal Camillo Pamphili. Through her mother she was the maternal grand-niece of Pope Innocent X and the paternal grand-niece of Pope Gregory XV, and the cousin of Olimpia Aldobrandini.

Unlike her two sisters Lavinia and Ippolita, Olimpia did not marry, instead she dedicated her life to the church as nun. In 1699, Olimpia's older brother Giovan Battista Ludovisi died and left his estate to his newborn son Niccolo under the regency of his widow Anna Maria Arduino. However, the young child died 1700 and Olimpia succeeded being the closest surviving paternal relative. 

Olimpia inherited all fiefs including Piombino. She was  the second Princess of Piombino to rule in her own right after Isabella Appiani. Olimpia remained a nun after her accession. 

Olimpia only reigned for several months until she died on 27 November 1700. Since she left no issued or children, the succession passed to her only surviving sibling granting continuity to the Ludovisi de Candia-Pamphili lineage of the Principality of Piombino issuing all inheritance and titles to her sister Ippolita.

References

 Mauro Carrara, Signori e principi di Piombino, Bandecchi & Vivaldi, Pontedera 1996.

1656 births
1700 deaths
17th-century Italian nobility
17th-century women rulers
17th-century Italian women
Princes of Piombino
Olimpia